The My Little Pony franchise debuted in 1982, the creation of American illustrator and designer Bonnie Zacherle. Together with sculptor Charles Muenchinger and manager Steve D'Aguanno, Bonnie submitted a design patent in August 1981 for "an ornamental design for a toy animal". She was then working for Hasbro. The patent was granted in August 1983.

Main Pony characters

Pony-related mythological characters

Fairy horses 
 Flutter Ponies
Flutter Ponies are fairy ponies with tiny bodies, curly hair, longer legs than regular ponies and fairy-like wings. They were first released in 1986. The Flutter Ponies may appear delicate, but in truth, they possess a powerful ability called the "Utter Flutter", which allows them to blow away everything in their path by flapping their wings rapidly. They are rarely seen, preferring to live in seclusion, usually in Flutter Valley. Honeysuckle, Morning Glory and Rosedust were the only notable ones in the first My Little Pony series.

 Breezies
The Breezies are small fairy ponies living in Breezy Blossom. These ponies usually have butterfly-like wings and antennae on their heads. Notable ones in the franchise were Tiddly Wink, Tra La La and Zipzee. They were first released in 2006. In Friendship is Magic, they are mentioned by Fluttershy in the episode called "Three's A Crowd" and they are featured in episode "It Ain't Easy Being Breezies" where they are shown to have their own language.

Aquatic horses 
 Seaponies and Baby Seaponies
The Seaponies are brightly colored seahorse-like creatures who dwell in the rivers and lakes of Dream Valley. They love underwater polo and can perform elaborate songs and dance numbers. They were first released in 1983 and only appeared in the two original specials. The Seaponies are based on the Hippocamp, a mythological creature shared by Phoenician and Greek mythology. A sub-line of the Seaponies called Baby Seaponies debuted in 1985 and later in My Little Pony: The Movie. Some additional Seaponies are shaped like merfolk.

 Hippogriffs and Hippocamps
Hippogriffs and Hippocamps are introduced in the 2017 My Little Pony: The Movie and Season 7 onwards of My Little Pony: Friendship Is Magic. They are a "hybrid sub-species" of ponies able to shapechange between forms to better adapt to an aquatic or mountainous environment.

Crystal Ponies 
Crystal Ponies are inhabitants of the Crystal Empire in My Little Pony: Friendship Is Magic. They appear as Earth Ponies with a few distinctive features. Their form changes depending on their mood. When they are sad and depressed, their manes and tails are flat and unstyled, their ears are always folded down, and their coats have a greyish hue. When they're happy (without the Crystal Heart), their manes and tails revert to different styles, their ears are up as normal, and their coats have a brighter hue. Additionally, mares get their decorations on their heads/hair. When in a more jubilant mood (with the Crystal Heart fully powered), all the Crystal Ponies retain their "happy mood" form and their bodies magically transform into a translucent crystallized form. The Crystal Heart also crystallizes the Mane Six, Spike, Shining Armor, Princess Luna, Princess Celestia, and Princess Cadance as well, albeit briefly (possibly reverting to their original forms as they exit the Crystal Empire).

Kirins 
Kirins are a race of unicorn-like creatures with lion-like traits. They are known for being kind and truthful, and their culture emphasizes theatrical and musical entertainment. When angered, they take on a beast-like form referred to as "Nirik" ("kirin" spelled backwards). They were formally introduced in the season eight episode "Sounds of Silence", where the Kirin character Autumn Blaze revealed that after their anger and bickering destroyed their own village, the elder Rain Shine forced them to bathe in an enchanted river that suppressed their ability to express emotions or speak (however, "foal's-breath" flowers are able to reverse the effects).

Other related pony types 
 Pony Friends
The Pony Friends is a sub-line of My Little Pony, first released in 1986. They are composed of animals bearing the same brushable hair and cutie marks as the ponies, such as a giraffe named Creamsicle, a lion named Kingsley, a zebra named Zig Zag, a camel named Spunky, a panda named Nectar, a sheep named Woolly, a cow calf named Leafy, a kangaroo named Hoppy, an elephant named Edgar, a moose named Oakly, a dinosaur named Cutesaurus, and a llama named Cha Cha. Each of the Pony Friends never made an appearance in the animated series, until My Little Pony: Friendship is Magic. The first one in the show was a zebra.

 Fairy Tails
The Fairy Tails is a short-lived sub-line, consisting of My Little Pony-esque birds, which are the titular Fairy Tails. The line was in stores from 1986 to 1987, corresponding with Year Five of original toy line. This year saw the release of the Pony Friends in the My Little Pony line, making it a distinct possibility that they and Fairy Tails were part of the same investigation into an expansion of My Little Pony that offered more than only ponies.

 Dream Beauties
Dream Beauties is another sub-line of My Little Pony, released in 1988. These were Hasbro's attempt at a more realistic version of My Little Pony.

 Takara variants

Only released in Japan, Bushiroad would eventually acquire the property from Takara Tomy 27 years later.

Non-Pony characters

Dragons 
As of Friendship is Magic, there are three, then four and now five dragon characters who appeared in the whole franchise. Spike, however, is the most notable.

Humans

Williams family 
Since the first toy line of My Little Pony, human characters were present in the franchise. The Williams siblings were the first set of human characters created for the entire series, and appeared in the original TV series.

Equestria Girls 

The Equestria Girls are the second set of human characters that were created for the franchise, which are featured in Friendship is Magic. They appear in the film series of the same name as their respective ponies' human counterparts.

The Dazzlings 
During Rainbow Rocks, Twilight Sparkle learned through research that the Dazzlings were sirens from Equestria who used their music to cause disharmony. They were banished to the human world by Star Swirl the Bearded. In the final battle against the Rainbooms, the band was defeated, causing the ruby gem pendants with which they controlled the students to shatter and explode. As a result, their inability to sing led to them being chased off in disgrace. The Dazzlings also return reformed performing a new song called "Find the Magic".

Pets

Allies

Antagonistic characters

References 
 General
 

 Specific

Further reading 
 Summer Hayes (May 1, 2008) The My Little Pony G1 Collector's Inventory: an unofficial full color illustrated collector's price guide to the first generation of MLP including all US ponies, playsets and accessories released before 1997 with a foreword by Dream Valley's Kim Shriner. Priced Nostalgia Press. 
 Summer Hayes (2007) The My Little Pony G3 Collector's Inventory: an unofficial full color illustrated guide to the third generation of MLP including all ponies, playsets and accessories from 2003 to the present. Priced Nostalgia Press. 
 Hillary DePiano (2005) The My Little Pony Collector's Inventory: A Complete Checklist of All US Ponies, Playsets and Accessories from 1981 to 1992. Priced Nostalgia Press. 
 Summer Hayes (2009) The My Little Pony 2007–2008 Collector's Inventory. Priced Nostalgia Press. 
 Debra L. Birge (2007) My Little Pony*r Around the World. Schiffer Publishing. 
 Wood, Walton. "The Empirical Twilight: A Pony's Guide to Science & Anarchism" ImageTexT: Interdisciplinary Comics Studies. 6.1 (2011): n. pag. Dept of English, University of Florida. 18 December 2011. Web.
 Brandon T. Snider. (2013) My Little Pony: The Elements of Harmony: Friendship is Magic: The Official Guidebook. Little, Brown Books. 

My Little Pony characters
My Little Pony
My Little Pony